Protestants are a very small community living in the de facto Turkish Republic of Northern Cyprus and amongst the Turkish Cypriot diaspora. The adherents of these churches number around two hundred and can be found living throughout northern Cyprus. The leader and Pastor of the community is Kemal Başaran. With the introduction of Protestantism to Cyprus with the arrival of the British, the vast majority are Anglican and use Anglican churches in the Kyrenia area along with the island's British expatriate community, though other Christian denominations have a presence too, such as Baptist churches and Pentecostal churches. In recent years, the community are demanding their own Church. Despite the general tolerance of the native Turkish Cypriot community, the community faces threats and sometimes attacks at the hands of mainland Turkish settlers and by island nationalists. In an interview with Havadis Gazette, Pastor Başaran said: "The Turkish Cypriots who belong to various religions in our country want to live freely with their religions. The Turkish Cypriots, the Bulgarian Turks and the Turks from Turkey, who are Protestants and consist of approximately 200 families, demand a church where they would be able to practise freely their worship." The roots of the Protestant Christian community lie in the period of British rule in Cyprus, though other Protestant Christians have settled in Cyprus after the colonial era there.

See also
 Religion in Cyprus

References

External links
 TRNC Press and Information Office
 Article on the community can found in Havadis Kibris Gazette
 Pseka Summary of Turkish Press Anglican
 Hellenic Resources

Christianity in Northern Cyprus
Society of Northern Cyprus
Christianity in Cyprus